Matthew Baker (born 6 February 2003) is a Welsh professional footballer who plays for Newport County, on loan from Stoke City as a defender.

Club career
Baker progressed through the Gillingham youth system and signed for Stoke City in June 2021. He moved on loan to Newport County in January 2023 for the remainder of the 2022–23 season. He made his Football League debut for Newport on 14 February 2023 in the League Two 2–2 draw against Stevenage.

International career
Baker is a Wales youth international and captained them at under-19 level. On 14 March 2023 he was called up to the under-21 team.

Career statistics

References

2003 births
Living people
Welsh footballers
Gillingham F.C. players
Stoke City F.C. players
Newport County A.F.C. players
English Football League players
Association football defenders
Wales youth international footballers
Wales under-21 international footballers